Nucras caesicaudata, the bluetailed sandveld lizard or bluetail scrub lizard, is a wall lizard in the family of true lizards (Lacertidae). It is found in southern Mozambique, southwestern Zimbabwe and the extreme northeast of South Africa. The lizard can clearly be distinguished because of its distinctive blue tail. Little has been discovered about its anatomy and way of life as it is rarely encountered, but it lives in the sandveld, a dry, sandy, savanna ecoregion.

References

External links 
 Blue-tailed sandveld lizard
 
 

Nucras
Lacertid lizards of Africa
Reptiles of Mozambique
Reptiles of South Africa
Reptiles of Zimbabwe
Reptiles described in 1972
Taxa named by Donald George Broadley